Eva Maria Dollinger (née Bramböck, born April 10, 1978 in Wörgl) is an Austrian triathlete.

She competed at the second Olympic triathlon at the 2004 Summer Olympics and took twenty-eighth place with a total time of 2:10:19.60.

In August 2005 she married Helmut Dollinger.

She also competed in the 2008 Olympic triathlon but did not finish the race.

References
 Profile

1978 births
Living people
Austrian female triathletes
Olympic triathletes of Austria
Triathletes at the 2004 Summer Olympics
Triathletes at the 2008 Summer Olympics
21st-century Austrian women